The Green Left is an anti-capitalist and eco-socialist grouping within the Green Party of England and Wales. It seeks to constitute a network for "socialists and other radicals" in the Green Party, as well as "act[ing] as an outreach body that will communicate the party's radical policies to other socialists and anti-capitalists outside the party." It includes some prominent members of the Green Party of England and Wales, and held its first meeting on 4 June 2006. Green Left members were early supporters of an "ecosocialist international", such as the Ecosocialist International Network (EIN) Green Left publishes the 'Watermelon'  a publication promoting eco-socialist policies to Green Party members on an array of issues. Green Left has a social media presence including on Twitter and Facebook. The Facebook site is very busy and has 9,000 members. Green Left engages the wider left with the aim to build for real change with eco-socialist policies and including just transition and supporting workers struggles. Green Left is very supportive of the Green Party Trade Union Group.

Formation
Green Left was launched on 4 June 2006 by members of the Green Party of England and Wales. Those who supported the group included various members of the Green Party of England and Wales Executive. Some members of Green Left then went on to be leaders of the party.

Aims and beliefs
Green Left formulated its beliefs, agreed on at the meeting, in the Headcorn Declaration (below), which stated that Green Left hopes "to raise Green Party politics to meet the demands of its radical policies". The statement criticised the "New Labour government's abandonment of the policies of the left" and claimed  "that the Green Party's progressive agenda makes it the natural home for the left".

The Headcorn Declaration
In June 2006, a number of members of the Green Party agreed to the core beliefs and policies of the Headcorn declaration which became a launch statement of the Green left. The launch statement included the following points:

Green Left is critical of capitalism, and sees capitalism as incompatible with ideals like sustainability, peace and social justice. As such it places itself in the tradition of William Morris, the British ecosocialist who operated within the Marxist Social Democratic Federation and Socialist League.
It seeks to unite all socialists, anti-capitalists and radicals, in and outside of the Green Party.
It welcomes and wishes to continue the grassroots democracy within the Green Party of England and Wales, which should remain a "bottom-up" organisation.
Green Left wants to apply the slogan think global, act local to its own party, by increasing international contacts, while also seeking to create local coalitions, made up of various groups such as trade unions, faith-based communities and other minority groups.

See also

 British Left
 Green left
 Green politics
 Social ecology

References

External links
Green Left facebook 
Green Left blog 
Green Left twitter  Twitter handle @UKGreenLeft 

Anti-capitalist organizations
Eco-socialism
Green Party of England and Wales
History of the Green Party of England and Wales
Left-wing politics in the United Kingdom
Political party factions in the United Kingdom
2006 establishments in the United Kingdom